Mitchell Kent Hoopes (July 8, 1953 – August 11, 2020) was an American football punter in the National Football League (NFL) for the Dallas Cowboys, San Diego Chargers, Houston Oilers, Detroit Lions and Philadelphia Eagles. He also was a member of the Boston Breakers in the United States Football League (USFL). He played college football at the University of Arizona.

Hoopes died on August 11, 2020, aged 67.

Early years
Hoopes attended Benson High School in Benson, Arizona, where he played as a halfback in Class B football. He received All-Conference, All-State and All-Star honors.

He enrolled at Eastern Arizona Junior College. He transferred after his sophomore season to the University of Arizona to play defensive back and punter.

As a junior in 1973, he ended up concentrating on punting and was among college football's leaders with a 43.9 average, second in school history at the time. As a senior in 1974, he averaged 41.8 yards, with a long of 59.

Professional career

Dallas Cowboys
Hoopes was selected by the Dallas Cowboys in the eighth round  (200th overall) of the 1975 NFL Draft, also known as the Dirty Dozen draft. That season he and Burton Lawless were the only rookies to earn starting jobs.

Facing 4th and 13th in the season opener against the Los Angeles Rams, he ran for a critical first down without informing head coach Tom Landry and helped the team achieve an 18–7 upset victory. He averaged 39.4 yards per punt and also completed one out of 3 passing attempts for 21 yards.

Playing in Super Bowl X with less than 12 minutes remaining in the fourth quarters, the Cowboys led 10-7 when Steelers backup running back Reggie Harrison broke through the middle of the offensive line and blocked a Hoopes' punt out of the end zone for a safety, cutting the lead to 10-9. The Steelers went on to win 21-17.

On August 3, 1976, with the arrival of Danny White who could play quarterback and punt, he was traded to the San Diego Chargers in exchange for an eight-round draft choice (#208-Al Cleveland) in the 1977 NFL draft.

San Diego Chargers
On November 9, 1976, Hoopes was released mid-season after averaging 38.8 yards per punt and running from a punt formation on a fourth and 17 against the Houston Oilers.

Houston Oilers
On November 12,  1976, he was signed by the Houston Oilers. On November 21, he was released after one game, for averaging only 31 yards a punt.

Saint Louis Cardinals
On May 18, 1977, Hoopes signed with the Saint Louis Cardinals. He was waived on September 9.

Detroit Lions
On September 10, 1977, he was claimed off waivers by the Detroit Lions. On September 22, he was released after one game, in which he had a punt blocked and another one returned for a touchdown.

Philadelphia Eagles
On June 7, 1978, he signed as a free agent with the Philadelphia Eagles. He became part of a revolving door at punter with Rick Engles, where he was signed three times during the season.

Boston Breakers (USFL)
On November 20, 1982, he was signed by the Boston Breakers of the United States Football League. He tore his right hamstring during mini-camp. Even though he was able to recover, he later re-injured the hamstring. He announced his retirement after the 13th game of the 1983 season. He registered 23 punts for 866 yards (37.7-yard avg.) with a long of 60 yards.

References

1953 births
2020 deaths
People from Bisbee, Arizona
Players of American football from Arizona
American football punters
Eastern Arizona Gila Monsters football players
Arizona Wildcats football players
Dallas Cowboys players
Houston Oilers players
San Diego Chargers players
Detroit Lions players
Philadelphia Eagles players
Boston/New Orleans/Portland Breakers players